Dale Tonge (born 7 May 1985) is an English former professional footballer who played as a full back or a midfielder. He is currently a first team coach at EFL Championship club Peterborough United

Career
He came through the youth ranks with Barnsley and made his debut on 17 April 2004 against Brentford.

On 20 March 2007, it was announced that he had joined Gillingham on loan. He made his Gillingham debut in the 5–0 away defeat to Carlisle United on 24 March, and returned to Barnsley one month later.

On 25 May 2007, he signed a two-year deal with Rotherham United.

On 25 October 2008, he scored his first career goal in a 2–1 win versus Macclesfield Town.

On 2 May 2009, Tonge was shown his first ever red card for professional foul in a 1–0 defeat to Exeter on the final day of the season, making almost 50 appearances in the 2008–09 season.
 
Tonge's following season was plagued with injury. He broke a foot in late 2009 while only managing 24 appearances and also missing the chance to play at Wembley in the league two playoff final against Dagenham & Redbridge.

On 2 May 2013, Tonge was released by Rotherham. He then signed for Torquay United on 2 July 2013, signed by ex- Rotherham manager Alan Knill. On 24 April 2015, Tonge was released by Torquay.

Tonge was on trial at Chester, before signing for them permanently. In 2016, Tonge joined FC United of Manchester. He left the club in 2017.

Honours
Barnsley
League One: playoff winners 2005–06

Rotherham United
League Two: promotion 2012–13 (Runners Up)

References

Sources

1985 births
Living people
English footballers
Association football midfielders
Barnsley F.C. players
Gillingham F.C. players
Rotherham United F.C. players
Torquay United F.C. players
Chester F.C. players
Stockport County F.C. players
English Football League players
F.C. United of Manchester players
Barnsley F.C. non-playing staff
Scunthorpe United F.C. non-playing staff
Peterborough United F.C. non-playing staff